Lucas Sebastián Haedo (born 18 April 1983) is an Argentine former road racing cyclist from Chascomús, Buenos Aires. He is the younger brother of fellow racing cyclist Juan José Haedo.

Major results

2005
 Vuelta Ciclista a León
1st Stages 3 & 5
2008
 1st Crystal Cup
 1st Tour of Somerville
2009
 1st Tour of Somerville
 1st Stage 2 Tour de San Luis
 1st Stage 2 Nature Valley Grand Prix
 8th Philadelphia International Championship
2012
 4th Châteauroux Classic
2014
 4th Overall Tour of Thailand
1st Stage 1
 6th Melaka Governor's Cup
2015
 Redlands Bicycle Classic
1st Stages 1 & 5
 1st Stage 4 Joe Martin Stage Race
 1st Stage 4 Tour of the Gila
2016
 Vuelta a Colombia
1st Stages 3 & 5
 1st Stage 2 Joe Martin Stage Race
 4th Philadelphia International Cycling Classic
2017
 1st Stage 2 Joe Martin Stage Race
2018
 8th Overall Tour de Korea

Grand Tour general classification results timeline

References

External links

 Team Profile

Living people
Argentine male cyclists
1983 births
People from Chascomús
Sportspeople from Buenos Aires Province